Mount Gephel is a small Tibetan mountain located 8 kilometers west of Lhasa in Tibet. Drepung Monastery lies at its foot.

Gephel
Chengguan District, Lhasa